Albert Mayer (born 6 April 1943) is a French sprint canoer who competed in the late 1960s. He was eliminated in the semifinals of the K-4 1000 m event at the 1968 Summer Olympics in Mexico City. His son Sébastien Mayer and granddaughter Joanne Mayer are also canoeists.

References
Sports-reference.com profile

1943 births
Canoeists at the 1968 Summer Olympics
French male canoeists
Living people
Olympic canoeists of France